Notelaea is a genus of Australian plants in the olive family. They are commonly known as 'mock-olives'. Twelve species are currently recognized.

Species
 Notelaea ipsviciensis W.K.Harris - Cooneana olive
 Notelaea johnsonii P.S.Green - veinless mock-olive
 Notelaea ligustrina Vent. - privet mock-olive, native olive, doral or silkwood
 Notelaea linearis Benth. - native olive
 Notelaea lloydii Guymer - Lloyd's olive
 Notelaea longifolia Vent. - large mock-olive, long-leaved olive
 Notelaea microcarpa R.Br. - gorge mock-olive, velvet mock-olive, small-fruited mock-olive
 Notelaea neglecta P.S.Green  
 Notelaea ovata R.Br. - forest olive
 Notelaea punctata R.Br. - large mock-olive
 Notelaea pungens Guymer 
 Notelaea venosa F.Muell. - large mock-olive, smooth mock-olive

References

 
Oleaceae genera
Lamiales of Australia
Plants described in 1803